The 2008 Chase for the Sprint Cup was contested in the final ten races of the 2008 NASCAR Sprint Cup Series to determine a champion. The Chase began with the Sylvania 300 on September 14, 2008 at New Hampshire Motor Speedway and ended with the Ford 400 on November 16, 2008 at Homestead-Miami Speedway. The 2008 Chase was won by Jimmie Johnson, his third consecutive championship.

From 2004 through 2007, the championship system was known as the "Chase for the Nextel Cup", but with the 2005 merger of Sprint and Nextel, the name of the series became known as the Sprint Cup Series in 2008.

Drivers

Seeding

♦ – Edwards was docked the ten-point winner's bonus as a result of a violation found during post-race inspection at the UAW-Dodge 400 in Las Vegas.

Schedule

≠ — Non-qualifier for the 2007 Chase.
Italics denotes non-qualifier for 2008 chase.
♣ – Denotes night race or race that will start in the late afternoon and finish at night.

Television
This marked the second year of exclusive national television coverage of the Chase for the Sprint Cup on ABC.  Dr. Jerry Punch remained in the play-by-play position, with Andy Petree in one color commentary position, but there were changes in the booth and host position.

Brent Musburger and Suzy Kolber were out in the host position, and former MRN Radio, TNT and NBC play-by-play voice Allen Bestwick took their place after spending the 2007 season on pit road. Joining him were 1989 NASCAR series champion Rusty Wallace and JTG Daugherty Racing owner and former Cleveland Cavaliers center Brad Daugherty in the on-site studio, while 1999 series champion Dale Jarrett took Wallace's spot in the broadcast booth and Shannon Spake replaced Bestwick on pit road, joining Jamie Little, Dave Burns and Mike Massaro.

Results
NOTE: Actual race finish in parentheses.

Race One: 2008 Sylvania 300

Results:
 Greg Biffle (1)
 Jimmie Johnson (2)
 Carl Edwards (3)
 Jeff Burton (4)
 Dale Earnhardt Jr. (5)
 Tony Stewart (8)
 Denny Hamlin (9)
 Kevin Harvick (10)
 Clint Bowyer (12)
 Jeff Gordon (14)
 Kyle Busch (35)
 Matt Kenseth (40)

Point Standings:
 Carl Edwards 5,220 ₧ (leader via tiebreaker with Johnson, six wins)
 Jimmie Johnson tied
 Greg Biffle −30
 Dale Earnhardt Jr. -50 (fourth via tiebreak with Burton, more top 5 finishes)
 Jeff Burton −50
 Denny Hamlin −72
 Tony Stewart −77
 Kyle Busch −78
 Clint Bowyer −83
 Kevin Harvick −86
 Jeff Gordon −99
 Matt Kenseth −177

Race Two: 2008 Camping World RV 400

Results:
 Greg Biffle (1)
 Matt Kenseth (2)
 Carl Edwards (3)
 Jimmie Johnson (5)
 Kevin Harvick(6)
 Jeff Gordon (7)
 Clint Bowyer (8)
 Jeff Burton (9)
 Tony Stewart (11)
 Dale Earhnhardt Jr. (24)
 Denny Hamlin (39)
 Kyle Busch (43)

Points:
 Carl Edwards, 5,390 ₧, leader
 Jimmie Johnson −10 (Second via tiebreaker with Biffle, four wins)
 Greg Biffle −10
 Jeff Burton −82
 Kevin Harvick −101
 Clint Bowyer −106
 Tony Stewart −113
 Jeff Gordon −118
 Dale Earhnardt Jr. -129
 Matt Kenseth −167
 Denny Hamlin, −193
 Kyle Busch, −210

Race Three: 2008 Camping World RV 400 presented by Coleman

Results:
 Jimmie Johnson (1)
 Carl Edwards (2)
 Greg Biffle (3)
 Jeff Gordon (4)
 Matt Kenseth (5)
 Kevin Harvick (6)
 Jeff Burton (7)
 Denny Hamlin (11)
 Clint Bowyer (12)
 Dale Earnhardt Jr. (13)
 Kyle Busch (28)
 Tony Stewart (40)

Points:
 Jimmie Johnson, 5,575 ₧, leader
 Carl Edwards, −10
 Greg Biffle, −30
 Jeff Burton, −121
 Kevin Harvick, −136
 Jeff Gordon, −143
 Clint Bowyer, −164
 Dale Earnhardt Jr., −190
 Matt Kenseth, −192
 Denny Hamlin, −243
 Tony Stewart, −255
 Kyle Busch, −311

Race Four: 2008 AMP Energy 500

Results:
 Tony Stewart (1)
 Jeff Burton (4)
 Clint Bowyer (5)
 Jimmie Johnson (9)
 Kyle Busch (15)
 Kevin Harvick (20)
 Greg Biffle (24)
 Matt Kenseth (26)
 Dale Earnhardt Jr. (28)
 Carl Edwards (29)
 Jeff Gordon (38)
 Denny Hamlin (39)

Points:
 Jimmie Johnson, 5,718 ₧, leader
 Carl Edwards, −72
 Greg Biffle, −77
 Jeff Burton, −99
 Clint Bowyer, −152
 Kevin Harvick, −171
 Tony Stewart, −203
 Jeff Gordon, −232
 Matt Kenseth, −245
 Dale Earnhardt Jr., −249
 Kyle Busch, −331
 Denny Hamlin, −335

Race Five: 2008 Bank of America 500

Results:
 Jeff Burton (1)
 Kyle Busch (4)
 Jimmie Johnson (6)
 Greg Biffle (7)
 Jeff Gordon (8)
 Tony Stewart (11)
 Clint Bowyer (12)
 Kevin Harvick (13)
 Denny Hamlin (16)
 Carl Edwards (33)
 Dale Earnhardt Jr. (36)
 Matt Kenseth (41)

Points:
 Jimmie Johnson, 5,878 ₧, leader
 Jeff Burton, −69
 Greg Biffle, −86
 Carl Edwards, −168
 Clint Bowyer, −185
 Kevin Harvick, −207
 Tony Stewart, −228
 Jeff Gordon, −245
 Kyle Busch, −326
 Dale Earnhardt Jr., −354
 Matt Kenseth, −360
 Denny Hamlin, −380

Race Six: 2008 TUMS QuikPak 500

Results:
 Jimmie Johnson (1)
 Dale Earnhardt Jr. (2)
 Carl Edwards (3)
 Jeff Gordon (4)
 Denny Hamlin (5)
 Kevin Harvick (7)
 Matt Kenseth (8)
 Clint Bowyer (9)
 Greg Biffle (12)
 Jeff Burton (17)
 Tony Stewart (26)
 Kyle Busch (29)

Points:
 Jimmie Johnson, 6,073 ₧, leader
 Greg Biffle, −149
 Jeff Burton, −152
 Carl Edwards, −198
 Clint Bowyer, −242
 Kevin Harvick, −256
 Jeff Gordon, −275
 Tony Stewart, −338
 Dale Earnhardt Jr., −379
 Matt Kenseth, −408
 Denny Hamlin, −420
 Kyle Busch, −445

See also
2008 NASCAR Sprint Cup Series
2008 NASCAR Nationwide Series
2008 NASCAR Craftsman Truck Series

References

External links
 NASCAR's Official Web Site
 Official Chase for the Sprint Cup Point Standings
 Jayski's Silly Season Site – NASCAR news

Chase for the Sprint Cup